The  command, also known as  (change directory), is a command-line shell command used to change the current working directory in various operating systems. It can be used in shell scripts and batch files.

Implementations 
The command has been implemented in operating systems such as Unix, DOS, IBM OS/2, MetaComCo TRIPOS, AmigaOS (where if a bare path is given, cd is implied), Microsoft Windows, ReactOS, and Linux. On MS-DOS, it is available in versions 2 and later. The command is also available in the open source MS-DOS emulator DOSBox and in the EFI shell. It is named  in HP MPE/iX. The command is analogous to the Stratus OpenVOS  command.

 is frequently included built directly into a command-line interpreter. This is the case in most of the Unix shells (Bourne shell, tcsh, bash, etc.), cmd.exe on Microsoft Windows NT/2000+ and Windows PowerShell on Windows 7+ and COMMAND.COM on DOS/ Microsoft Windows 3.x-9x/ME.

The system call that effects the command in most operating systems is  that is defined by POSIX.

Command line shells on Windows usually use the Windows API to change the current working directory, whereas on Unix systems  calls the  POSIX C function. This means that when the command is executed, no new process is created to migrate to the other directory as is the case with other commands such as ls. Instead, the shell itself executes this command. This is because, when a new process is created, child process inherits the directory in which the parent process was created. If the  command inherits the parent process' directory, then the objective of the command cd will never be achieved.

Windows PowerShell, Microsoft's object-oriented command line shell and scripting language, executes the  command (cmdlet) within the shell's process. However, since PowerShell is based on the .NET Framework and has a different architecture than previous shells, all of PowerShell's cmdlets like ,  etc. run in the shell's process. Of course, this is not true for legacy commands which still run in a separate process.

Usage 
A directory is a logical section of a file system used to hold files. Directories may also contain other directories. The  command can be used to change into a subdirectory, move back into the parent directory, move all the way back to the root directory or move to any given directory.

Consider the following subsection of a Unix filesystem, which shows a user's home directory (represented as ) with a file, and three subdirectories.

If the user's current working directory is the home directory, then entering the command ls followed by  might produce the following transcript:

user@wikipedia:~$ ls
workreports games encyclopedia text.txt
user@wikipedia:~$ cd games
user@wikipedia:~/games$

The user is now in the "games" directory.

A similar session in DOS (though the concept of a "home directory" may not apply, depending on the specific version) would look like this:

 C:\> dir
 workreports        <DIR>       Wed Oct 9th   9:01
 games              <DIR>       Tue Oct 8th  14:32
 encyclopedia       <DIR>       Mon Oct 1st  10:05
 text        txt           1903 Thu Oct10th  12:43
 C:\> cd games
 C:\games>

DOS maintains separate working directories for each lettered drive, and also has the concept of a current working drive. The  command can be used to change the working directory of the working drive or another lettered drive. Typing the drive letter as a command on its own changes the working drive, e.g. ; alternatively,  with the  switch may be used to change the working drive and that drive's working directory in one step.
Modern versions of Windows simulate this behaviour for backwards compatibility under CMD.EXE.

Note that executing  from the command line with no arguments has different effects in different operating systems. For example, if   is executed without arguments in DOS, OS/2, or Windows, the current working directory is displayed (equivalent to Unix pwd). If  is executed without arguments in Unix, the user is returned to the home directory.

Executing the  command within a script or batch file also has different effects in different operating systems. In DOS, the caller's current directory can be directly altered by the batch file's use of this command.  In Unix, the caller's current directory is not altered by the script's invocation of the  command. This is because in Unix, the script is usually executed within a subshell.

Options

Unix, Unix-like 
  by itself or  will always put the user in their home directory.
  will leave the user in the same directory they are currently in (i.e. the current directory won't change). This can be useful if the user's shell's internal code can't deal with the directory they are in being recreated; running  will place their shell in the recreated directory.
 cd ~username will put the user in the username's home directory.
  will move the user up one directory. The user can use this indirection to access subdirectories too.
  will switch the user to the previous directory. The user can use this to toggle back and forth between two directories without pushd and popd.

DOS, OS/2, Windows, ReactOS 
 no attributes print the full path of the current directory.
  Print the final directory stack, just like dirs.
  Entries are wrapped before they reach the edge of the screen.
  entries are printed one per line, preceded by their stack positions.
  (DOS and Windows only) returns to the root dir. Consequently, command  always takes the user to the named subdirectory on the root directory, regardless of where they are located when the command is issued.

Interpreters other than an operating systems shell 

The numerical computing environments MATLAB and GNU Octave include a cd
function with similar functionality. The command also pertains to command-line interpreters of various other application software.

See also 
Directory structure
pushd and popd
chroot
List of command-line interpreters

References

Further reading

External links 

 Windows XP > Command-line reference A-Z > Chdir (Cd) from Microsoft TechNet
 

Internal DOS commands
File system directories
Inferno (operating system) commands
IBM i Qshell commands
MSX-DOS commands
OS/2 commands
ReactOS commands
Windows administration
Standard Unix programs
Unix SUS2008 utilities